Han Yaqin (born 18 August 1963) is a female Chinese rower. She competed at 1988 Seoul Olympic Games. Together with her teammates, she won a bronze medal in women's coxed eight.

References

Chinese female rowers
1963 births
Rowers at the 1988 Summer Olympics
Olympic rowers of China
Olympic bronze medalists for China
Living people
Olympic medalists in rowing
Medalists at the 1988 Summer Olympics